Marcelleina is a genus of fungi within the Pezizaceae family. The genus was circumscribed in 1967.

The genus name of Marcelleina is in honour of Marcelle Louise Fernande Le Gal (1895-1979), who was a French mycologist and lichenologist.

Species
According to a standard reference text, Marcelleina is widespread in distribution and contains nine species; two new species were since published in 2010 and 2011.

Marcelleina atroviolacea
Marcelleina benkertii
Marcelleina brevicostatispora
Marcelleina chopraiana
Marcelleina donadinii
Marcelleina georgii
Marcelleina mediterranea
Marcelleina parvispora
Marcelleina persoonii
Marcelleina pseudoanthracina
Marcelleina rickii
Marcelleina tuberculispora

References

Pezizaceae
Pezizales genera
Taxa named by Richard P. Korf
Taxa described in 1967